The 2023 National Hurling League, known for sponsorship reasons as the Allianz Hurling League, is the 92nd season of the National Hurling League, an annual hurling competition held in Ireland for county teams. Three English county teams also feature. Waterford are the title holders.

It takes place between 4 February and 9 April.

Format

League structure

Thirty-five teams compete in the 2023 NHL –
 twelve teams organised in two six-team groups of approximately equal strength in Division 1
 six teams in Divisions 2A, 2B and 3A
 five teams in Division 3B.
All thirty-two county teams from Ireland take part. London, Lancashire and Warwickshire complete the lineup.

Each team plays all the other teams in their group or division once, either home or away. Two points are awarded for a win, and one for a draw.

Tie-breaker
 If only two teams are level on league points, the team that won the head-to-head match is ranked ahead. If this game was a draw, score difference (total scored minus total conceded in all games) is used to rank the teams.
 If three or more teams are level on league points, score difference is used to rank the teams.

Finals, promotions and relegations

Division 1
The top two teams in each group play in the NHL semi-finals and final.
 The bottom team in each group meet in a relegation play-off, with the losers being relegated to Division 2A
Division 2A
Second and third place meet in the Division 2A semi-final
 The first-placed team plays the semi-final winner in the Division 2A final, with the winners being promoted to Division 1
 The bottom team is relegated to Division 2B
Division 2B
Second and third place meet in the Division 2B semi-final
 The first-placed team plays the semi-final winner in the Division 2B final, with the winners being promoted to Division 2A
 The bottom two teams meet in a relegation play-off, with the losers being relegated to Division 3A
Division 3A
Second and third place meet in the Division 3A semi-final
 The first-placed team plays the semi-final winner in the Division 3A final, with the winners being promoted to Division 2B
 The bottom team is relegated to Division 3B
Division 3B
Second and third place meet in the Division 3B semi-final
 The first-placed team plays the semi-final winner in the Division 3B final, with the winners being promoted to Division 3A

Division 1

Division 1 Format

The top twelve teams compete in Division 1 in two six-team groups of approximately equal strength. This group structure was introduced in 2020; the groups were redrawn for 2022 and 2023.

Each team play all the other teams in their group once. Two points are awarded for a win and one for a draw. The top two teams in each group qualifies for the NHL semi-finals.

Division 1 Group A Table

Division 1 Group A Rounds 1 to 5

Division 1 Group A Round 1
This game is also the final of the 2023 Walsh Cup.

Division 1 Group A Round 2

Division 1 Group A Round 3

Division 1 Group A Round 4

Division 1 Group A Round 5

Division 1 Group B Table

Division 1 Group B Rounds 1 to 5

Division 1 Group B Round 1

Division 1 Group B Round 2

Division 1 Group B Round 3

Division 1 Group B Round 4

Division 1 Group B Round 5

Division 1 Semi-Finals

Division 1 Final

Division 1 relegation play-off

The bottom teams in the two Division 1 groups meet in a play-off with the losers being relegated to Division 2A.

Division 1 scoring statistics

Overall

In a single game

Division 2A

Division 2A Table

Division 2A Rounds 1 to 5

Division 2A Round 1

Division 2A Round 2

Division 2A Round 3

Division 2A Round 4

Division 2A Round 5

Division 2A Semi-Final

Division 2A Final

Division 2A scoring statistics

Overall

In a single game

Division 2B

Division 2B Table

Division 2B Rounds 1 to 5

Division 2B Round 1

Division 2B Round 2

Division 2B Round 3

Division 2B Round 4

Division 2B Round 5

Division 2B Semi-Final

Division 2B Final

Division 2B relegation play-off

Division 2B scoring statistics

Overall

In a single game

Division 3A

Division 3A Table

Division 3A Rounds 1 to 5

Division 3A Round 1

Division 3A Round 2

Division 3A Round 3

Division 3A Round 4

Division 3A Round 5

Division 3A Semi-Final

Division 3A Final

Division 3A scoring statistics

Overall

In a single game

Division 3B

Division 3B Table

Division 3B Rounds 1 to 5

Division 3B Round 1

Division 3B Round 2

Division 3B Round 3

Division 3B Round 4

Division 3B Round 5

Division 3B Semi-Final

Division 3B Final

Division 3B scoring statistics

Overall

In a single game

References

External links
Full Fixtures and Results

League
National Hurling League seasons
National Hurling League